State of the Arts is the third studio album from hip hop artist Afu-Ra. The album features production from DJ Premier and Bronze Nazareth. It contains guest appearances from Royce da 5'9", Masta Killa and Gentleman. "God of Rap" was released as a single but failed to chart.

Track listing
 "Intro"
 "God of Rap" (used in NBA Live 06 soundtrack)
 "Power (Skit #1)"
 "Pusha" (feat. Royce da 5'9")
 "Prankster"
 "Livin Like Dat" (feat. Masta Killa)
 "Rumble"
 "Power (Skit #2)"
 "Why Cry" (feat. Gentleman)
 "Ghetto Hell"
 "Cry Baby" (feat. Lady Blue, Q)
 "Dynamite"
 "Sucka Free"
 "Deal wit It" (feat. Kardinal Offishall, Jahdon)
 "BK Dance"
 "Only U"
 "Poisonous Taoist"
 "Power (Skit #3)"

Production 
 Afu-Ra – track 1,   
 Eric Weis – track 2, 7, 16
 DJ Roach – track 4
 PF Cuttin – track 5, 17
 Bronze Nazareth – track 6
 DJ Kemo – track 9
 Natty Dred – track 10
 Compressor Beats – track 11
 Preservation – track 12
 DJ Premier – track 13
 Curt Cazal – track 14
 Big Syphe – track 15
powerful -3,8,12,18

References

External links 
 

Afu-Ra albums
2005 albums
Albums produced by Bronze Nazareth